There are at least 78 members of the barberry and buttercup order, Ranunculales, found in Montana. Some of these species are exotics (not native to Montana) and some species have been designated as Species of Concern.

Barberries
Family: Berberidaceae
Berberis repens, creeping Oregon-grape
Berberis vulgaris, European Barberry
Berberis nervosa, longleaf Oregon-grape
Berberis aquifolium, Piper's Oregon-grape

Buttercups

Family: Ranunculaceae

Aconitum columbianum, Columbia monkshood
Actaea rubra, red baneberry
Adonis aestivalis, summer adonis
Anemone Canadensis, Canada anemone
Anemone cylindrica, long-fruited anemone
Anemone drummondii, Little Belt Mountain thimbleweed
Anemone multifida, Pacific anemone
Anemone nuttalliana, prairie-crocus
Anemone occidentalis, western pasqueflower
Anemone parviflora, small-flower anemone
Anemone piperi, Piper's anemone
Aquilegia brevistyla, short-styled columbine
Aquilegia coerulea, Colorado columbine
Aquilegia flavescens, yellow columbine
Aquilegia formosa, Sitka columbine
Aquilegia jonesi, Jones' columbine
Caltha leptosepala, white marsh-marigold
Clematis columbiana, purple virgin's-bower
Clematis hirsutissima, sugarbowls
Clematis ligusticifolia, western virgin's-bower
Clematis occidentalis, purple clematis
Coptis occidentalis, western goldthread
Delphinium ajacis, doubtful knight's-spur
Delphinium andersonii, Anderson's larkspur
Delphinium bicolor, limestone larkspur
Delphinium burkei, meadow larkspur
Delphinium depauperatum, slim larkspur
Delphinium geyeri, Geyer's larkspur
Delphinium glaucescens, Electric Peak larkspur
Delphinium glaucum, pale larkspur
Delphinium nuttallianum, Nuttall's larkspur
Delphinium occidentale, tall larkspur
Myosurus apetalus, bristly mousetail
Myosurus minimus, eastern mousetail
Pulsatilla nuttalliana, pasqueflower
Ranunculus abortivus, kidneyleaf buttercup
Ranunculus acriformis, sharpleaf buttercup
Ranunculus acris, tall buttercup
Ranunculus adoneus, western wild buttercup
Ranunculus alismifolius, plantainleaf buttercup
Ranunculus aquatilis, white water buttercup
Ranunculus cardiophyllus, heart-leaved buttercup
Ranunculus cymbalaria, alkali buttercup
Ranunculus eschscholtzii, Eschscholtz's buttercup
Ranunculus flammula, lesser spearwort
Ranunculus glaberrimus, sagebrush buttercup
Ranunculus gmelinii, small yellow buttercup
Ranunculus grayi, arctic buttercup
Ranunculus hyperboreus, high-arctic buttercup
Ranunculus inamoenu, graceful buttercup
Ranunculus jovis, potential Jove's buttercup
Ranunculus macounii, Macoun's buttercup
Ranunculus orthorhynchus, straightbeak buttercup
Ranunculus pedatifidus, northern buttercup
Ranunculus pensylvanicus, bristly crowfoot
Ranunculus populago, mountain buttercup
Ranunculus pygmaeus, dwarf buttercup
Ranunculus repens, creeping buttercup
Ranunculus rhomboideus, prairie buttercup
Ranunculus sceleratus, cursed buttercup
Ranunculus testiculatus, curveseed butterwort
Ranunculus uncinatus, woodland buttercup
Thalictrum alpinum, alpine meadowrue
Thalictrum dasycarpum, purple meadowrue
Thalictrum fendleri, Fendler's meadowrue
Thalictrum occidentale, western meadowrue
Thalictrum sparsiflorum, few-flower meadowrue
Thalictrum venulosum, veined meadowrue
Trautvetteria caroliniensis, Carolina tassel-rue
Trollius laxus, spreading globeflower

Further reading

See also
 List of dicotyledons of Montana

Notes

Montana
Montana